Barkley Regional Airport  is 14 miles west of Paducah, in McCracken County, Kentucky, United States. It is used for general aviation and sees one airline, subsidized by the Essential Air Service program.

100 people are employed at the airport. The only airline is Contour Airlines, with Embraer 145 flights to Charlotte.  Barkley Regional Airport is the 5th busiest airport in Kentucky. A new terminal building is under construction, set to open in 2023, replacing the current terminal which has been in use since the mid-1950's. 

The Federal Aviation Administration (FAA) National Plan of Integrated Airport Systems for 2017–2021 categorized it as a non-hub primary commercial service facility.
Federal Aviation Administration records say this airport had 21,654 passenger boardings (enplanements) in calendar year 2008, 18,542 in 2009 and 19,903 in 2010.

History
Barkley Regional Airport is named after former Vice President of the United States Alben W. Barkley, who was from western Kentucky. The airport was previously served by Northwest Airlink (operated by Mesaba Airlines) Saab 340 regional turboprops with service to Memphis International Airport. When Northwest Airlines merged with Delta Air Lines, service to Memphis from Paducah was discontinued.  New airline service began when Chicago-based United Airlines started daily Canadair CRJ200 regional jets nonstop to Chicago O'Hare International Airport with this service operated by SkyWest Airlines flying as United Express on behalf of United. Service began in the winter of 2010. This service was replaced by Contour Airlines on December 6, 2022 with nonstop flights to Charlotte, NC, using Embraer 145 regional jets.

Originally built as a military airfield in 1941, thanks to the efforts of then Senator Alben Barkley, the airfield was originally used to facilitate U.S. Army Air Corps B-17 bomber crew training which was taking place at nearby Dyersburg, TN. In 1945 the U.S. government deeded the land to the city of Paducah and McCracken County, making it available for civilian use. 

On April 1, 1946, a Chicago and Southern Air Lines (C&S Air Lines) Douglas DC-3 was the first airline flight out of Paducah and the airport has had scheduled airline flights ever since. Chicago and Southern was then acquired by Delta Air Lines which in turn continued to serve Paducah.  Ozark Airlines arrived in 1951.  According to the Official Airline Guide (OAG), two airlines were serving Paducah in 1976:  Delta with McDonnell Douglas DC-9-30 jets nonstop from Evansville and  Memphis as well as direct, no change of plane DC-9-30 jet flights from Atlanta, Birmingham, AL, Boston, Chicago O'Hare Airport, Indianapolis and Philadelphia, and Ozark with nonstop McDonnell Douglas DC-9-30 jet and/or Fairchild FH-227B turboprop flights from Clarksville, TN, Louisville, Nashville and St. Louis as well as direct, no change of plane DC-9-30 jet flights from Chicago O'Hare Airport, Columbia, MO, Indianapolis, Kansas City and Milwaukee. Delta left in 1979 and Ozark pulled out in 1980.

Several commuter and regional air carriers operating turboprop aircraft served Paducah during the 1980s.  In 1981 Air Illinois was operating nonstop service from Cape Girardeau, MO, Carbondale, IL, Memphis and St. Louis with larger Hawker Siddeley HS 748 regional aircraft as well as with smaller de Havilland Canada DHC-6 Twin Otter and Handley Page Jetstream commuter aircraft while Allegheny Commuter was flying on behalf of USAir nonstop from Louisville with Beechcraft commuter aircraft.  In 1985 Allegheny Commuter had expanded its service on behalf of USAir with nonstops from Evansville, Louisville, Nashville, and Owensboro, KY with Beechcraft 99s while  Britt Airways was flying nonstop from Cape Girardeau, Evansville, Memphis and St. Louis with Fairchild Swearingen Metroliner propjets.  By 1989 three airlines were serving the airport:  American Eagle operating on behalf of American Airlines with nonstop service from Nashville flown with Fairchild Swearingen Metroliners, Northwest Airlink flying on behalf of Northwest Airlines nonstop from Evansville and Memphis with British Aerospace BAe Jetstream 31 and Saab 340 aircraft, and Trans World Express operated by Air Midwest on behalf of Trans World Airlines (TWA) nonstop from Evansville and St. Louis flown with Fairchild Swearingen Metroliners and Saab 340 aircraft.

Facilities
Barkley Regional Airport covers 1,018 acres (412 ha) at an elevation of 410 feet (125 m). It has two asphalt runways: 5/23 is 6,500 by 150 feet (1,981 x 46 m) and 14/32 is 5,499 by 150 feet (1,676 x 46 m). An expansion of runway 14/32 was completed in December 2005.

In 2015 the airport had 23,269 aircraft operations, average 63 per day: 80% general aviation, 8% military, 6% air taxi and 6% airline. In March 2017, 40 aircraft were based at the airport: 29 single-engine, 6 multi-engine, 4 jet and 1 helicopter.

FBO, Fixed Base Operator Midwest Aviation provides Charter services, flight training, aircraft maintenance, aircraft rental, avionics service, aircraft sales, and other aviation services. 
website https://www.midwest-aviation.com/

FAA data visit: FAA data

Airline and destination

Passenger

Statistics

References

Other sources

 Essential Air Service documents (Docket DOT-OST-2009-0160) from the U.S. Department of Transportation:
 Ninety-day notice (July 15, 2009): from Mesaba Aviation, Inc. of its intent to discontinue unsubsidized scheduled air service at the following communities, effective October 12, 2009: Paducah, KY; Alpena, MI; Muskegon, MI; Hancock, MI; Sault Ste. Marie, MI; International Falls, MN; Tupelo, MS and Eau Claire, WI.
 Essential Air Service documents (Docket OST-2009-0299) from the U.S. Department of Transportation:
 Memorandum (November 19, 2009): closing out docket DOT-2009-0160 and opening up eight new dockets for the various communities (Alpena, MI; Eau Claire, WI; Hancock/Houghton, MI; International Falls, MN; Muskegon, MI; Paducah, KY; Sault Ste. Marie, MI; Tupelo, MS).
 Order 2009-10-8 (October 16, 2009): selecting SkyWest Airlines, Inc., d/b/a United Express, to provide subsidized essential air service (EAS) at Hancock/Houghton and Muskegon, Michigan, Paducah, Kentucky, and Eau Claire, Wisconsin.
 Order 2012-1-24 (January 26, 2012): tentatively re-selecting SkyWest Airlines, Inc. to provide Essential Air Service (EAS) with subsidy rates as follows: Eau Claire, Wisconsin, $1,733,576; Hancock/Houghton, Michigan, $934,156; Muskegon, Michigan, $1,576,067; and Paducah, Kentucky, $1,710,775.
 Order 2012-2-2 (February 1, 2012): makes final the selection of SkyWest Airlines, Inc., to provide Essential Air Service at Eau Claire, Wisconsin; Hancock/Houghton, Michigan; and Paducah, Kentucky (at Muskegon, the selection of SkyWest was not finalized at this time).
 Order 2013-10-8 (October 21, 2013): reselecting Delta Air Lines, Inc., to provide Essential Air Service (EAS) at Pellston and Sault Ste. Marie, Michigan; and SkyWest Airlines, at Paducah, Kentucky; Hancock/Houghton, and Muskegon, Michigan; and Eau Claire, Wisconsin. The Order also tentatively reselects American Airlines, at Watertown, New York. Paducah, Kentucky: Docket 2009-0299; Effective Period: January 1, 2014, through January 31, 2016; Service: Fourteen (14) nonstop round trips per week to Chicago O'Hare (ORD); Aircraft Type: CRJ-200; Annual Subsidy: $2,034,160.

External links
 Barkley Regional Airport, official site
 NWS Paducah Kentucky
 Aerial image as of November 1998 from USGS The National Map
 
 

Airports in Kentucky
Buildings and structures in McCracken County, Kentucky
Essential Air Service
Transportation in McCracken County, Kentucky